"Ring Spiel" Tour '95 is a live album by American musician Mike Watt, documenting his first solo tour after being a member of Minutemen and fIREHOSE in the 1980s and early '90s. Ring Spiel was recorded in 1995 and released in 2016. The album material is from the tour to accompany Watt's first solo album, Ball-Hog or Tugboat?.

Tour
The Ball-Hog or Tugboat? album had 48 contributors, with a different musician lineup on each song, so Watt never thought he could tour the album. Dave Grohl called with an idea for how to create a small touring band with Eddie Vedder's band Hovercraft and Dave Grohl's newly formed Foo Fighters opening for Watt.

Watt's touring band consisted of Grohl on guitar and drums, Vedder and Pat Smear on guitars, and William Goldsmith on drums, alongside Watt on bass guitar and vocals. Grohl wanted to play more guitar so he only played drums on eight songs with Goldsmith handling the rest. Wanting to keep the tour low-profile, promoters of the tour were instructed to not use Grohl or Vedder's names to promote the tour but word leaked and MTV showed up at one tour stop.

Album release
When Columbia/Legacy approached Watt about releasing the album he was initially hesitant and suggested the label contact the other musicians to see how they felt about the idea. Watt was afraid some of the others would be embarrassed to have an album from twenty years earlier released. "It turns out they weren't embarrassed. They wanted it out." Pat Smear urged Watt to release the album as well.

Track listing 
All tracks composed by Mike Watt; except where indicated

 Walking the Cow (Daniel Johnston cover)
 Big Train (Chip + Tony Kinman cover)
 Formal Introduction
 Against the '70s
 Drove Up from Pedro
 Habit (Early Performance of Eddie Vedder an Composition)
 Makin' the Freeway
 Chinese Firedrill
 Piss-Bottle Man
 Forever ... One Reporter's Opinion
 E-Ticket Ride
 Political Song for Michael Jackson to Sing
 Coincidence is Either Hit or Miss
 The Red and the Black (Blue Öyster Cult cover)
 Secret Garden (Madonna cover)
 Powerful Hankerin'

Reception
SLUG magazine praised the album calling it an "astonishing sonic time capsule." Pitchfork said "At their best, live albums capture not just a concert performance, but also document the energy and the context around the music. "ring spiel" tour '95 manages to accomplish all of the above; it's a nice time capsule if you were there, and it's a great document to have if you weren't, commemorating early years of musicians who are now canonic."

Personnel
Mike Watt: vocals, bass

Eddie Vedder: guitar, vocals

Pat Smear: guitar, vocals

William Goldsmith: drums

Dave Grohl: drums, guitar

References

External links 
 Mike Watt's Hoot Page
 Glossary Of Pedro Slang (from sonymusic.com)

Mike Watt albums
2016 live albums
Columbia Records albums